Client(s) or The Client may refer to:

 Client (business)
 Client (computing), hardware or software that accesses a remote service on another computer
 Customer or client, a recipient of goods or services in return for monetary or other valuable considerations
 Client (ancient Rome), an individual protected and sponsored by a patron
 Client (band), a British synthpop band
 Client (album), a 2003 album by Client
 Clients (album), a 2005 album by The Red Chord
 The Client (novel), a 1993 legal thriller by John Grisham
 The Client (1994 film), a film adaptation
 The Client (TV series), a 1995–1996 television series adaptation
 The Client (Star Wars), a character in The Mandalorian
 The Client (2011 film), a South Korean courtroom thriller
 "The Client" (The Office), an episode of The Office

See also 
 Client (prostitution)
 Client state, which is economically, politically, or militarily subordinate to another more powerful state